Phanuel Bishop (September 3, 1739 – January 6, 1812) was a United States representative from Massachusetts. Born in Rehoboth in the Province of Massachusetts Bay, he attended the common schools, was an innkeeper, and served in the Massachusetts State Senate from 1787 to 1791. He was a member of the Massachusetts House of Representatives in 1792, 1793, 1797, and 1798, and was elected as a Democratic-Republican to the Sixth through Ninth Congresses, serving from March 4, 1799 to March 3, 1807. He died in Rehoboth, Mass; interment was in Old Cemetery, Rumford, Rhode Island.

References

1739 births
1812 deaths
Massachusetts state senators
Members of the Massachusetts House of Representatives
People from Rehoboth, Massachusetts
Democratic-Republican Party members of the United States House of Representatives from Massachusetts